Mór ingen Cearbhaill, daughter of the Cerball mac Dúnlainge king of Osraige. She became queen of Laigin; she died in 916.

The Annals of the Four Masters, sub anno 916, say of her, "Mor, daughter of Cearbhall, son of Dunghal, Queen of South Leinster, died after a good life."

The identity of her husband is uncertain: contenders include Augaire mac Ailella, or the ruler of the Uí Cheinnselaig at the time, such as Dub Gilla mac Etarscéoil (died 903) or Tadg mac Fáeláin (died 922).

See also
Mór (Irish name)

External links
 http://www.medievalscotland.org/kmo/AnnalsIndex/Feminine/Mor.shtml
 http://www.ucc.ie/celt/online/T100005B/text002.html
 https://www.fitzpatricksociety.com

Irish royal consorts
10th-century Irish women
10th-century Irish people
916 deaths
Year of birth unknown
9th-century Irish people
9th-century Irish women
FitzPatrick dynasty